List of magazines and newspapers of Fars classifies the newspapers and magazines of Fars Province by the date first number was published.

Magazines published in Iran
Mass media in Fars Province
Fars
Magazines, Fars